D. Wayne Mitchell (born August 7, 1964) is an American actor, playwright and director.
He became the Educational Director of TBA Theatre Company in Anchorage, Alaska in 2003.

Bio
Mitchell holds a Bachelor of Arts degree from the University of Alaska Anchorage and a Masters of Arts from Wichita State University. While at WSU, he was the Director of Theatre and Dance department's Education Outreach program for which he was awarded the Outstanding Graduate Student Award in 1994. Following his graduate studies, Wayne worked as the tour manager for Wichita Children's Theatre, as well as directing WCT's teen production program "Center Stage." In 1996, he founded and served as the Artistic Director for the Bend Theatre for Young People, in Bend, Oregon.

He has received two Patricia Neal acting award while performing at the Last Frontier Theatre Conference in Valdez, Alaska.

In 2000, he was chosen to represent the United States at the Olympic Arts Festival in Sydney, Australia.

He was the 2002 recipient of the Outstanding Arts Education award by the Anchorage Concert Association.
 
As of 2021, he serves as TBA's Technical Director.

Playwriting credits
Jolly Roger King of The Pirates was co-written with his twin brother Shane and Shane's wife Erin.
In 2008, Mitchell wrote and directed Legend of the Wolfman, an adaptation of the classic tale. Other produced works include Otogibanashi, The Invisible Man, The Pyrates, and The Circus of the Damned.

Performance credits
Mitchell performs frequently with various theater companies in Anchorage, Alaska, and has received several awards for his on-stage performances. Selected performances include Edgar Allan Poe in The Death of Edgar Allan Poe (2010), Frog in A Year With Frog and Toad (2009), George in The Daemon of Darby Castle (2009), Scrooge in A Christmas Carol (2008), B7 in The Head That Wouldn't Die (2007), Estragon in Waiting for Godot (2003), and originating the role of The Abbot in The Witch of Greythorn. In addition, he has originated multiple roles in both straight and musical shows for the Wichita Children's Theatre outreach programs.

References

1964 births
Living people
American theatre directors
American male stage actors
20th-century American dramatists and playwrights
People from Tooele, Utah
University of Alaska Anchorage alumni